The Athletics at the 2016 Summer Paralympics – Men's 200 metres T42 event at the 2016 Paralympic Games took place on 10–11 September 2016, at the Estádio Olímpico João Havelange.

Heats

Heat 1 
18:18 10 September 2016:

Heat 2 
18:24 10 September 2016:

Final 
19:08 11 September 2016:

Notes

Athletics at the 2016 Summer Paralympics
2016 in men's athletics